Somié is a village in Bankim, Mayo-Banyo in the Adamawa Region of Cameroon. It is located near the Nigeria – Cameroon border at 6°28' N, 11° 27' E. It has an officially designated "second degree" chief, several schools, churches and mosques as well as a government health centre.  There is a small solar power installation that has been providing electricity to the village since 2018. The Mambila people who live there are predominantly farmers.

List of the chiefs of Somié 
 Tulum
 Ndinyura
 Chomo/Chókmo
 Nyura: first contact with the Germans (Hurault)
 Menandi: 8 wives; 10 as chief
 Konaka (Kolaka in official documents): chief from 1923? to 1949 died in Nov. 49
 Ndi Etienne: chief from 1950 to end June 1953
 Mɔgɔ Michel: 6 wives; chief from 1954 to December 1976
 Dega François: born in 1950 died 29 April 2002; chief from November 1977 to 2002.
 Ndi Adam: Died 15 September 2017 chief from 2003 to 2017
 Ernest Konaka: chief from Jan 2018

References

External links
 www.mambila.info

Populated places in Adamawa Region